Ermitage may refer to:
 Ermitage (concert hall), performance hall in Montreal, Quebec
 Ermitage blanc, white wine grape
 International School of France, also known as Ermitage

See also 

 Hermitage museum
 Hermitage (disambiguation)